Zhujianglu station is a station on Line 1 of the Nanjing Metro.

Statistics

Around the station
 Fu Baoshi Memorial
 Jizhaoying Mosque
 John Rabe House
 Nanjing University Library

References

Railway stations in Jiangsu
Railway stations in China opened in 2005
Nanjing Metro stations